Ben Shephard (1948–2017) was an English historian, author, and television producer. He was educated at Diocesan College, Cape Town, and Westminster School. He graduated in history from Oxford University and made many historical documentaries for the BBC and Channel 4, including producer of  The World at War and The Nuclear Age. He died on 25 October 2017 at the age of 69.

Bibliography
 A War of Nerves: Soldiers and Psychiatrists, 1914—1994, Jonathan Cape, London
 After Daybreak: The Liberation of Belsen, 1945, Pimlico, London, 2005, 
 The Long Road Home: The Aftermath of the Second World War, Penguin Random House, 2012

References

External links
 Brief Biography
 Review of A War of Nerves in Medscape
 Review of The Long Road Home

1948 births
2017 deaths
Alumni of Diocesan College, Cape Town
Alumni of University College, Oxford
English historians
English television producers
People educated at Westminster School, London
20th-century British businesspeople